Başalan (literally "head taker") is a Turkish place name that may refer to the following places in Turkey:

 Başalan, Bozdoğan, a village in the district of Bozdoğan, Aydın Province
 Başalan, Çınar
 Başalan, Vezirköprü, a village in the district of Vezirköprü, Samsun Province